The 114th New York State Legislature, consisting of the New York State Senate and the New York State Assembly, met from January 6 to April 30, 1891, during the seventh year of David B. Hill's governorship, in Albany.

Background
Under the provisions of the New York Constitution of 1846, 32 Senators and 128 assemblymen were elected in single-seat districts; senators for a two-year term, assemblymen for a one-year term. The senatorial districts were made up of entire counties, except New York County (seven districts) and Kings County (three districts). The Assembly districts were made up of entire towns, or city wards, forming a contiguous area, all within the same county.

At this time there were two major political parties: the Democratic Party and the Republican Party. In New York City, the Democrats were split into two factions: Tammany Hall and the "County Democracy". The Prohibition Party and the Socialist Labor Party also nominated tickets.

Elections
The New York state election, 1890 was held on November 4. The only statewide elective office up for election was carried by the incumbent Judge of the Court of Appeals Robert Earl, a Democrat who was endorsed by the Republicans. The approximate party strength at this election, as expressed by the vote for Judge of the Court of Appeals, was: Democratic/Republican 927,000; Prohibition 34,000; and Socialist Labor 13,000.

Sessions
The Legislature met for the regular session at the State Capitol in Albany on January 6, 1891; and adjourned on April 30.

William F. Sheehan (D) was elected Speaker with 66 votes against 56 for Milo M. Acker (R).

On January 21, the Legislature elected Governor David B. Hill (D) to succeed William M. Evarts (R) as U.S. Senator from New York, for a six-year term beginning on March 4, 1891. However, Governor Hill remained in office until the end of his term on December 31, 1891, and took his seat in the U.S. Senate only on January 7, 1892.

State Senate

Districts

Note: There are now 62 counties in the State of New York. The counties which are not mentioned in this list had not yet been established, or sufficiently organized, the area being included in one or more of the abovementioned counties.

Members
The asterisk (*) denotes members of the previous Legislature who continued in office as members of this Legislature.

Employees
 Clerk: John S. Kenyon
 Sergeant-at-Arms: Charles V. Schram
 Doorkeeper: Edward R. Gibbons
 Stenographer: George H. Thornton

State Assembly

Assemblymen
The asterisk (*) denotes members of the previous Legislature who continued as members of this Legislature.

Employees
 Clerk: Charles R. DeFreest
Clerk for the Committee on Cities: Morris Jacoby
 Sergeant-at-Arms: Michael B. Redmond
 Doorkeeper: Edward A. Moore
 First Assistant Doorkeeper: Lawrence D. Fitzpatrick
 Second Assistant Doorkeeper: Kenneth D. L. Nivin
 Stenographer: Thomas Hassett

Notes

Sources
 The New York Red Book compiled by Edgar L. Murlin (published by James B. Lyon, Albany NY, 1897; see pg. 384f for senate districts; pg. 403 for senators; pg. 410–417 for Assembly districts; and pg. 508f for assemblymen)
 Biographical sketches of the members of the Legislature in The Evening Journal Almanac (1891)
 THE ASSEMBLY SLATE FIXED in NYT on January 6, 1891

114
1891 in New York (state)
1891 U.S. legislative sessions